Khalidiya is an area in Kuwait City; it is located in the governorate of Al Asimah in Kuwait.

References

Populated places in Kuwait
Suburbs of Kuwait City